Hemisphaerius is a genus of bugs in the family Issidae and tribe Hemisphaeriini.  Species resemble the closely related Gergithus: but are differentiated in this genus by the size of the frons and shorter legs.

Species
Fulgoromorpha Lists On the Web includes:

 Hemisphaerius affinis Melichar, 1914
 Hemisphaerius alutaceus Melichar, 1906
 Hemisphaerius ardus Melichar, 1906
 Hemisphaerius astridae Lallemand, 1931
 Hemisphaerius atromaculatus Distant, 1916
 Hemisphaerius biarcuatus Melichar, 1906
 Hemisphaerius bigeminus Melichar, 1906
 Hemisphaerius bijeminus Distant, 1916
 Hemisphaerius bimaculatus Che, Zhang & Wang, 2006
 Hemisphaerius binduseni Constant & Jiaranaisakul, 2020
 Hemisphaerius binocularis Chen, Zhang & Chang, 2014
 Hemisphaerius bipunctatus Melichar, 1906
 Hemisphaerius bipustulatus Walker, 1858
 Hemisphaerius bistriatus Schumacher, 1915
 Hemisphaerius bizonatus Matsumura, 1916
 Hemisphaerius cassidoides Walker, 1862
 Hemisphaerius cattienensis Constant & Pham, 2011
 Hemisphaerius celebensis Melichar, 1906
 Hemisphaerius cervinus Walker, 1870
 Hemisphaerius chilochorides Walker, 1851
 Hemisphaerius chloris Melichar, 1906
 Hemisphaerius chlorophanus Melichar, 1906
 Hemisphaerius cinctus Melichar, 1906
 Hemisphaerius circumcinctus Stål, 1863
 Hemisphaerius coccinelloides (Burmeister, 1834) - type species
 Hemisphaerius coccinelloides var. formosus Schumacher, 1914
 Hemisphaerius coccineus Matsumura, 1916
 Hemisphaerius collaris Walker, 1870
 Hemisphaerius concolor Walker, 1870
 Hemisphaerius contusus Walker, 1851
 Hemisphaerius corvinus Melichar, 1906
 Hemisphaerius cruentatus Butler, 1875
 Hemisphaerius delectabilis Schumacher, 1914
 Hemisphaerius dilatatus Walker, 1870
 Hemisphaerius dubius Butler, 1875
 Hemisphaerius elegantulus Melichar, 1906
 Hemisphaerius elongatus Distant, 1906
 Hemisphaerius fasciatus Stål, 1863
 Hemisphaerius flavimacula Walker, 1851
 Hemisphaerius flavovariegatus Melichar, 1906
 Hemisphaerius flavus Butler, 1875
 Hemisphaerius formosus Melichar, 1913
 Hemisphaerius frontalis Melichar, 1906
 Hemisphaerius fuscoclypeatus Distant, 1916
 Hemisphaerius gagatus Melichar, 1906
 Hemisphaerius geminatus Melichar, 1906
 Hemisphaerius herbaceus Kirby, 1891
 Hemisphaerius hippocrepis Constant & Pham, 2011
 Hemisphaerius hoozanensis Schumacher, 1915
 Hemisphaerius imitatus Melichar, 1906
 Hemisphaerius impexus Melichar, 1906
 Hemisphaerius interclusus Noualhier, 1896
 Hemisphaerius javanensis Melichar, 1906
 Hemisphaerius javensis Kirkaldy, 1913
 Hemisphaerius kotoshonis Matsumura, 1938
 Hemisphaerius latipes Stål, 1863
 Hemisphaerius lativitta Walker, 1870
 Hemisphaerius lunaris Walker, 1870
 Hemisphaerius lygaeus Melichar, 1906
 Hemisphaerius lygeus Lallemand, 1942
 Hemisphaerius lysanias Fennah, 1978
 Hemisphaerius maculatus Melichar, 1906
 Hemisphaerius maculipes Melichar, 1906
 Hemisphaerius moluccanus Kirkaldy, 1913
 Hemisphaerius monticola Bergroth, 1913
 Hemisphaerius morio Melichar, 1906
 Hemisphaerius nigritus Melichar, 1906
 Hemisphaerius nigrolimbatus Melichar, 1906
 Hemisphaerius nilgiriensis Distant, 1906
 Hemisphaerius nitidus Stål, 1870
 Hemisphaerius noctis Distant, 1916
 Hemisphaerius palaemon Fennah, 1978
 Hemisphaerius parenthesis Banks, 1910
 Hemisphaerius penumbrosus Fennah, 1955
 Hemisphaerius pissopterus Bergroth, 1913
 Hemisphaerius plagiatus Walker, 1870
 Hemisphaerius pulcherrimus Stål, 1863
 Hemisphaerius pullatus Stål, 1863
 Hemisphaerius recurrens Butler, 1875
 Hemisphaerius reticulatus Distant, 1906
 Hemisphaerius ruficeps Melichar, 1906
 Hemisphaerius rufovarius Walker, 1858
 Hemisphaerius rufus Melichar, 1914
 Hemisphaerius sauteri Melichar, 1913
 Hemisphaerius sauteri Schmidt, 1910
 Hemisphaerius schaumi Stål, 1855
 Hemisphaerius scymnoides Walker, 1862
 Hemisphaerius secundus Melichar, 1903
 Hemisphaerius sexvittatus Stål, 1870
 Hemisphaerius seymnoides Walker, 1862
 Hemisphaerius signatus Stål, 1863
 Hemisphaerius signifer Walker, 1851
 Hemisphaerius similis Melichar, 1906
 Hemisphaerius sinifer Walker, 1851
 Hemisphaerius stali Banks, 1910
 Hemisphaerius subapicalis Butler, 1875
 Hemisphaerius submaculatus Melichar, 1906
 Hemisphaerius submarginalis Walker, 1870
 Hemisphaerius subopacus Bergroth, 1913
 Hemisphaerius taeniatus Stål, 1863
 Hemisphaerius takagii Hori, 1969
 Hemisphaerius tappanus Matsumura, 1916
 Hemisphaerius testaceus Distant, 1906
 Hemisphaerius tongbiguanensis Chen, Zhang & Chang, 2014
 Hemisphaerius torpidus Walker, 1857
 Hemisphaerius transfasciatus Banks, 1910
 Hemisphaerius triangularis Melichar, 1914
 Hemisphaerius trilobulus Che, Zhang & Wang, 2006
 Hemisphaerius trimaculatus Banks, 1910
 Hemisphaerius tristis Stål, 1863
 Hemisphaerius typicus Walker, 1857
 Hemisphaerius variabilis Butler, 1875
 Hemisphaerius varicolor Stål, 1870
 Hemisphaerius variegatus Stål, 1870
 Hemisphaerius venosus Distant, 1906
 Hemisphaerius viduus Stål, 1863
 Hemisphaerius villicus Stål, 1863
 Hemisphaerius virescens Distant, 1906
 Hemisphaerius viridis Walker, 1870
 Hemisphaerius vittiger Stål, 1863

References

External links

Auchenorrhyncha genera
Hemisphaeriinae
Hemiptera of Asia